Eli Landa (born 21 March 1984 in Sandnes, Norway, but currently living in Stavanger) is a Norwegian model, bank employee and teacher student at the University of Stavanger who was crowned Frøken Norge Universe 2009 (Miss Norway Universe 2009) on 28 March 2009. The winner of the Frøken Norge World title was Sara Skjoldnes from Skien.

Landa travelled to the Bahamas to represent Norway in Miss Universe 2009, where Miss Universe 2008, Dayana Mendoza of Venezuela, crowned her successor, Stefanía Fernández, also from Venezuela, on 23 August 2009. Landa was not among the Top 15 semi-finalists.

Previously, she has competed in a Norwegian model contest called Årets Ansikt (Face of the Year) in 2003 where she was a finalist, and New Silk Road Model Look 2003 in Hangzhou, China.

References
 Aftenbladet.no - Eli Landa til Miss Universe

External links
 Eli's presentation video at Frøken Norge 2009

Living people
1984 births
Miss Universe 2009 contestants
People from Sandnes
Norwegian female models
Norwegian beauty pageant winners